Reginald G. Lloyd (second ¼ 1917 – death unknown), also known by the nickname of "Wolla", was a Welsh rugby union and professional rugby league footballer who played in the 1930s and 1940s. Reg Lloyd was a Corporal in the British Army during World War II.

Playing career

International honours
Lloyd won caps for Wales (RL) while at Castleford in 1946 against England (2 matches) and France, and in 1947 against France (2 matches), New Zealand, and England.

Challenge Cup Final appearances
Reg Lloyd played , i.e. number 5, scored a try, and aged-19 was youngest player ever to appear in a Wembley Final, in Keighley's 5–18 defeat by Widnes in the 1937 Challenge Cup Final during the 1936-37 season at Wembley Stadium, London on Saturday 8 May 1937, in front of a crowd of 47,699.

County League appearances
Reg Lloyd played in Castleford's victory in the Yorkshire County League during the 1938–39 season.

Other notable matches
Reg Lloyd played  for Northern Command XIII against a Rugby League XIII at Thrum Hall, Halifax on Saturday 21 March 1942.

References

External links
(archived by web.archive.org) Statistics at thecastlefordtigers.co.uk
Cymdeithas Hanes Resolfen History Society: Mel de Lloyd

1917 births
British Army personnel of World War II 
Castleford Tigers players
Keighley Cougars players
Northern Command XIII rugby league team players
Place of death missing
Resolven RFC players
Rugby league players from Resolven
Rugby union players from Resolven
Rugby league wingers
Wales national rugby league team players
Welsh rugby league players
Welsh rugby union players
Year of death missing